

Biography
Giandomenico Facchina was born in 1826 in Sequals, today in the province of Pordenone in the Friuli Venezia Giulia region, at that time part of the Lombard-Venetian Kingdom.
He was trained in Trieste and Venice. He first worked on the restoration of ancient mosaics, including the St Mark's Basilica in Venice.
In the 1850s he traveled to France, first to Montpellier, where he was called to work on the restoration of old floors.

He filed a patent for a method of extracting ancient mosaic pavements at the National Institute of Industrial Property in 1858, 
reusing a technique already practiced by Venetian mosaic experts. 
He also used a derivative of this technique, which allows a prefabricated mosaic to be made in the workshop, facilitating production of the mosaic. 
In this technique, the mosaic tiles are pre-assembled and glued onto a flexible cardboard; the wall to hold the mosaic is then covered with fresh mortar and mosaic installed at once, reducing the working time on site and allowing a considerable reduction of production costs. 
This technique was used very successful at the Exposition Universelle (1855) in Paris and spread rapidly. 
It allowed Facchina get many orders. 
At Paris, he decorated, among others, the new opera house built by Charles Garnier.

Until his death in 1903 Giandomenico Facchina divided his time between his studios in Venice and Paris.

Main works

 Opéra Garnier
 Musée Galliera
 Musée Grévin
 Carnavalet Museum
 Petit Palais
 Printemps Haussmann
 Le Bon Marché
 Galerie Vivienne
 Comptoir national d'escompte de Paris
 Lycée Louis-le-Grand
 Lycée Chaptal
 Collège Sainte-Barbe (now the Bibliothèque Sainte-Barbe)
 Théâtre Antoine

Source
 Biography by Gianni Colledani @ the Dizionario Biografico dei Friulani

External links

 "Giandomenico Facchina: an Italian in Père Lachaise" @ the Scuola Mosaicisti del Friuli

Italian artists
1826 births
1903 deaths
Mosaic artists
People from the Province of Pordenone